The 2024 United States Senate election in Massachusetts will be held on November 5, 2024, to elect a member of the United States Senate to represent the state of Massachusetts. Incumbent two-term Democratic Senator Elizabeth Warren was re-elected with 60.3% of the vote in 2018. Warren is running for re-election.

Democratic primary

Candidates

Declared
Elizabeth Warren, incumbent U.S. Senator (2013–present)

Potential
Joe Kennedy III, U.S. Special Envoy for Northern Ireland (2022–present), former U.S. Representative for Massachusetts's 4th congressional district (2013–2021), and candidate for U.S. Senate in 2020
Marty Walsh, former U.S. Secretary of Labor (2021–2023) and former mayor of Boston (2014–2021)
Michelle Wu, mayor of Boston (2021–present)

Declined
Jake Auchincloss, U.S. Representative for Massachusetts's 4th congressional district (2021–present)
Ayanna Pressley, U.S. Representative for Massachusetts's 7th congressional district (2019–present)

Republican primary

Candidates

Potential
Karyn Polito, former Lieutenant Governor of Massachusetts (2015–2023)

General election

Predictions

References

External links
Official campaign websites 
Elizabeth Warren (D) for Senate

2024
Massachusetts
United States Senate